is a Japanese professional drifting driver, currently competing in the D1 Grand Prix series for D-MAX. He is the younger brother of Naoto who both were taught by Nobushige Kumakubo.

He began his motorsport career racing minibikes in the Kyūshū area, later winning a title. Following this, his motorcycle racing career ended at the age of 20 caused by injuries. As Naoto was involved in the 'Tono Club' hashiriya group (which one of the members included Katsuhiro Ueo), he also became involved which he was taught how to drift by Naoto. Masao later joined the 'Gowasu?' hashiriya group.

He has been competing in the D1 Grand Prix series since . In 2002 and  he was the youngest driver to compete in the top 16 and he was soon picked up by RE Amemiya a renowned tuner of rotary powered cars. So he switched from his Nissan Silvia to a Mazda RX-7 (FD3S) went from strength to strength. The Silvia would be driven by Naoto until he became one of the Kumakubo led Team Orange drivers. Masao took his first win in 2005 and went on to place second overall.

He is one of the few D1GP drivers to compete the spinoff D1 Street Legal series in his own FD RX-7 winning the first two rounds of the inaugural season.

Suenaga competed in the M150 20B-Powered FD3S RX-7 in the inaugural Formula Drift: Asia at Fuji Speedway Japan where he would take first place against Masashi Yokoi.

He had been with RE Amemiya for years, but left in 2016. In 2017, he was picked up by Toyo Tires GLION TRUST RACING and became teammate of Masato Kawabata. He drove Nissan GT-R (R35).

From 2020, he belongs to D-MAX and works with Masashi Yokoi.

Complete Drifting Results

D1 Grand Prix

D1 Street Legal

Sources
D1 Grand Prix

References

External links
Gowasu?のホームページ - Official page
D1 Supporter profile
D1 Supporter profile (D1SL)

Japanese racing drivers
Drifting drivers
1978 births
Living people
D1 Grand Prix drivers
People from Kagoshima